is a Japanese butterfly swimmer.

She attended Osaka Seikei Girls' High School.

Major achievements 
2000 Sydney Olympics 
200m butterfly 7th (Heat 2:10.22, Semifinal 2:09.89, Final 2:09.66)
2004 Athens Olympics 
100m butterfly 14th (Heat 1:00.16, Semifinal 59.53)
200m butterfly 3rd (Heat 2:10.04, Semifinal 2:08.83, Final 2:08.04)
2008 Beijing Olympics
100m butterfly 18th (Heat 58.61)
200m butterfly 5th (Heat 2:06.62, Semifinal 2:06.96, Final 2:07.32)

Personal bests 
In long course
 100m butterfly: 58.52 (April 16, 2008)
 200m butterfly: 2:06.38 Japanese Record (April 19, 2008)

References 

 http://www.joc.or.jp/beijing/athlete/aquatics/nakanishiyuko.html

1981 births
Living people
Olympic swimmers of Japan
Japanese female butterfly swimmers
Swimmers at the 2000 Summer Olympics
Swimmers at the 2004 Summer Olympics
Swimmers at the 2008 Summer Olympics
Olympic bronze medalists for Japan
People from Ikeda, Osaka
Sportspeople from Osaka Prefecture
World record setters in swimming
Olympic bronze medalists in swimming
World Aquatics Championships medalists in swimming
Asian Games medalists in swimming
Swimmers at the 2002 Asian Games
Swimmers at the 2006 Asian Games
Medalists at the 2004 Summer Olympics
Universiade medalists in swimming
Asian Games gold medalists for Japan
Asian Games silver medalists for Japan
Asian Games bronze medalists for Japan
Medalists at the 2002 Asian Games
Medalists at the 2006 Asian Games
Universiade gold medalists for Japan
Medalists at the 2001 Summer Universiade
20th-century Japanese women
21st-century Japanese women